Stanford White (November 9, 1853 – June 25, 1906) was an American architect. He was also a partner in the architectural firm McKim, Mead & White, one of the most significant Beaux-Arts firms. He designed many houses for the rich, in addition to numerous civic, institutional, and religious buildings. His temporary Washington Square Arch was so popular that he was commissioned to design a permanent one. His design principles embodied the "American Renaissance".

In 1906, White was shot and killed at the Madison Square Theatre by Harry Kendall Thaw, in front of a large audience during a musical theatre performance. Thaw was a wealthy but mentally unstable heir of a coal and railroad fortune who had become obsessed by White's alleged drugging and rape of, and subsequent relationship with, the woman who was to become Thaw's wife, Evelyn Nesbit, which had started when she was about 16, four years before her 1905 marriage to Thaw. By the time of the killing, Nesbit was a famous fashion model who was performing as an actress in the show. With the elements of a sex scandal among the wealthy and the public killing, the resulting sensational trial of Thaw was dubbed "The Trial of the Century" by contemporary reporters. Thaw was ultimately found not guilty by reason of insanity.

Early life and training
White was born in New York City in 1853, the son of Richard Grant White, a Shakespearean scholar,  and Alexina Black (née Mease) (1830–1921). His father was a dandy and Anglophile with little money but with many connections to New York's art world, including the painter John LaFarge, the stained-glass artist Louis Comfort Tiffany, and the landscape architect Frederick Law Olmsted.

White had no formal architectural training; like many other architects at the time, he learned on the job as an apprentice. Beginning at age 18, he worked for six years as the principal assistant to Henry Hobson Richardson, known for his personal style (often called "Richardsonian Romanesque") and considered by many to have been the greatest American architect of his day. 

In 1878, White embarked on a year and a half tour of Europe, to learn about historical styles and trends. When he returned to New York in September 1879, he joined two young architects, Charles Follen McKim and William Rutherford Mead, to form the firm of McKim, Mead and White. As part of the partnership, they agreed to credit all of the firm's designs as the work of the collective firm, not to be attributed to any individual architect.

In 1884, White married 22-year-old Bessie Springs Smith, daughter of J. Lawrence Smith. She was from a socially prominent Long Island family. Her ancestors had settled in what became Suffolk County in the colonial era, and Smithtown, was named for them. The White couple's estate, Box Hill, was both a home and a showplace for the luxe design aesthetic which White offered to prospective wealthy clients. Their son, Lawrence Grant White, was born in 1887.

McKim, Mead and White

Commercial and civic projects

In 1889, White designed the triumphal arch at Washington Square, which, according to White's great-grandson, architect Samuel G. White, is the structure for which White should be best remembered. White was director of the Washington Centennial celebration. His temporary triumphal arch was so popular, that money was raised to construct a permanent version.

Elsewhere in New York City, White designed the Villard Houses (1884), the second Madison Square Garden (1890, demolished in 1925), the Cable Building at 611 Broadway (1893), the baldechin (1888 to mid-1890s) and altars of Blessed Virgin and St. Joseph (both completed in 1905) at St. Paul the Apostle Church, the New York Herald Building (1894; demolished 1921), and the IRT Powerhouse on 11th Avenue and 58th Street. 

White also designed the Bowery Savings Bank Building at the intersection of the Bowery and Grand Street (1894), Judson Memorial Church on Washington Square, the Lambs Club Building, the Century Club, Madison Square Presbyterian Church, as well as the Gould Memorial Library (1903), originally for New York University. It is now part of the campus of Bronx Community College and is the site of the Hall of Fame for Great Americans.

White was also commissioned for churches, estates and other major buildings outside New York City: 

 The First Methodist Episcopal Church in Baltimore, Maryland (1887), now Lovely Lane United Methodist Church.
 The Cosmopolitan Building, a three-story Neo-classical Revival building topped by three small domes, built in Irvington, New York, in 1895 as headquarters of Cosmopolitan Magazine. 
 Cocke, Rouss, and Cabell halls at the University of Virginia. In 1889, he reconstructed the university's Rotunda, three years after it had burned down. (In 1976, his work was changed to restore Thomas Jefferson's original design of the Rotunda for the United States Bicentennial.) 
 The Blair Mansion at 7711 Eastern Avenue in Silver Spring, Maryland (1880). In the early 21st century, it was being used as commercial space, for a violin store. 
 The Boston Public Library, on Copley Square, Boston, Massachusetts.
 The Benjamin Walworth Arnold House and Carriage House (1902) in Albany, New York. 

He helped to develop Nikola Tesla's Wardenclyffe Tower, his last design.

White designed several clubhouses that became centers for New York society, and which still stand: the Century, Colony, Harmonie, Lambs, Metropolitan, and The Players clubs. He designed two golf clubhouses. His Shinnecock Hills Golf Clubhouse design in Suffolk County on the South Shore is said to be the oldest golf clubhouse in the United States, and has been designated as a golf landmark. Palmetto Golf Club in Aiken, South Carolina boasts the second. It was completed in 1902. His clubhouse for the Atlantic Yacht Club, built in 1894 overlooking Gravesend Bay, burned down in 1934. 

Sons of society families resided in White's St. Anthony Hall Chapter House at Williams College; the building is now used for college offices.

Residential properties

In the division of projects within the firm, the sociable and gregarious White landed the most commissions for private houses. His fluent draftsmanship helped persuade clients who were not attuned to a floorplan. He could express the mood of a building he was designing. 

Many of White's Long Island mansions have survived. These houses can be classified as three types, depending on their locations: Gold Coast chateaux along the wealthiest tier, mostly in Nassau County; neo-Colonial structures, especially those in the neighborhood of his own house at "Box Hill" in Smithtown, Suffolk County; and the South Fork houses in Suffolk County, from Southampton to Montauk Point, influenced by their coastal location. He also designed the Kate Annette Wetherill Estate in 1895.

White designed a number of other New York mansions as well, including the Iselin family estate "All View" and "Four Chimneys" in New Rochelle, suburban Westchester County. White designed several country estate homes in Greenwich, Connecticut, including the Seaman-Brush House (1900), now the Stanton House Inn, operated as a bed and breakfast. In New York's Hudson Valley, he designed the 1896 Mills Mansion in Staatsburg. 

Among his "cottages" in Newport, Rhode Island, at Rosecliff (1898–1902, designed for Mrs. Hermann Oelrichs) he adapted Mansart's Grand Trianon. The mansion was built for large receptions, dinners, and dances with spatial planning and well-contrived dramatic internal views en filade. His "informal" shingled cottages usually featured double corridors for separate circulation, so that a guest never bumped into a laundress with a basket of bed linens. Bedrooms were characteristically separated from hallways by a dressing-room foyer lined with closets, so that an inner door and an outer door gave superb privacy.

One of the few surviving urban residences designed by White is the Ross R. Winans Mansion in Baltimore's Mount Vernon-Belvedere neighborhood. It is now used as the headquarters for Agora, Inc. Built in 1882 for Ross R. Winans, heir to Ross Winans, the mansion is a premier example of French Renaissance revival architecture. Since its period as Winans's residence, it has served as a girls preparatory school, doctor's offices, and a funeral parlor, before being acquired by Agora Publishing. In 2005, Agora completed an award-winning renovation project.

White designed Golden Crest Estate in Elberon Park, NJ while at McKim Mead and White for E. F. C. Young, President of the First National Bank of Jersey City and unsuccessful Democratic candidate for New Jersey Governor in 1892. He built the house in 1901, as a golden wedding anniversary gift for Young's wife Harriet. In 1929, the house was sold to Victor and Edmund Wisner, who ran it as a rooming house for summer vacationers. In the 1960s, it was a fraternity house for the then Monmouth College. From 1972 to 1976, it was owned and restored by Mary and Samuel Weir. It is now a private residence.  

White lived the same life as his clients, albeit not quite so lavishly, and he knew how the house had to perform: like a first-rate hotel, theater foyer, or a theater set with appropriate historical references. He could design a cover for Scribner's Magazine or design a pedestal for his friend Augustus Saint-Gaudens's sculpture. 

He extended the limits of architectural services to include interior decoration, dealing in art and antiques, and planning and designing parties. He collected paintings, pottery, and tapestries for use in his projects. If White could not acquire the right antiques for his interiors, he would sketch neo-Georgian standing electroliers or a Renaissance library table. His design for elaborate picture framing, the Stanford White frame, still bears his name today. Outgoing and social, he had a large circle of friends and acquaintances, many of whom became clients. White had a major influence in the Shingle Style of the 1880s, Neo-Colonial style, and the Newport cottages for which he is celebrated.

He designed and decorated Fifth Avenue mansions for the Astors, the Vanderbilts (in 1905), and other high society families.

Personal life
White, a tall, flamboyant man with red hair and a red mustache, impressed some as witty, kind, and generous. The newspapers frequently described him as "masterful", "intense", "burly yet boyish". He was a collector of rare and costly artwork and antiquities. He maintained a multi-story apartment with a rear entrance on 24th Street in Manhattan. One room was painted green and outfitted with a red velvet swing, which hung from the ceiling suspended by ivy-twined ropes. He used playing with the elaborate swing as a means to groom under-age girls for a sexual relationship, including Evelyn Nesbit, a popular photographer's fashion model and chorus dancer. 

After White was killed and the newspapers began to investigate his life, continuing through the trial of Thaw, the married architect's sexual relations with numerous underage girls were revealed.  The White family historian Suzannah Lessard writes: 

White belonged to an underground sex circle, made up of select members from the Union Club, a legitimate men's club. According to Simon Baatz:

Mark Twain, who was acquainted with White, included an evaluation of his character in his Autobiography. It reflected Twain's deep immersion in the testimony of the Thaw murder trial. Twain said that New York society had known for years preceding the incident that the married White was 

Based on White's correspondence, including that conducted with Augustus Saint-Gaudens, recent biographers have concluded that White was bisexual, and that the office of McKim, Mead & White was unruffled by this. White's granddaughter has written that Stanford's eldest son (her father) was "unflinching in his awareness of Stanford's nature".

Murder

In 1901, White established a caretaking relationship with Evelyn Nesbit, helping Nesbit get established as a model for artists and photographers in New York society, with the approval of Nesbit's mother. Five years later, Nesbit would testify that one evening he invited her to his apartment for dinner and gave her champagne and possibly some drug, and then raped her after she passed out: she was about 16 years old at this time and White was 48. 

For a period of at least six months afterwards, they acted as lovers and companions. Although they drifted apart, they remained in touch with each other and on good terms socially.

In 1905 she married Harry Kendall Thaw, a Pittsburgh millionaire with a history of severe mental instability. Thaw was jealous and thought of White as his rival. But, well before he was killed, White had moved on to other young women as lovers. White considered Thaw a poseur of little consequence and categorized him as a clown, once calling him the "Pennsylvania pug" a reference to Thaw's baby-faced features.

Accompanied by New York society figure James Clinch Smith, White dined at Martin's, near the theatre at Madison Square Garden. As it happened, Thaw and Nesbit also dined there, and Thaw was said to have seen White at the restaurant.

That evening the premiere of Mam'zelle Champagne was being performed at the theatre. During the show's finale, "I Could Love A Million Girls", Thaw approached White, produced a pistol, said, "You've ruined my wife", and fired three shots at White from two feet away. He hit White twice in the face and once in his upper left shoulder, killing him instantly.  The crowd's initial reaction was to think the incident was an elaborate party trick. When it became apparent that White was dead, chaos ensued.

Nineteen-year-old Lawrence Grant White was guilt-ridden after his father was slain, blaming himself for the death. "If only he had gone [to Philadelphia]!" he lamented, referring to a trip that had been planned. Years later, he would write, "On the night of June 25th, 1906, while attending a performance at Madison Square Garden, Stanford White was shot from behind [by] a crazed profligate whose great wealth was used to besmirch his victim's memory during the series of notorious trials that ensued." (In fact, White was shot in the face, from directly in front of him, not from behind.)

White was buried in St. James, New York, in Suffolk County.

News coverage
Following the killing, there was blanket press coverage, as well as editorial speculation and gossip. Journalistic interest in the sensational story was sustained. William Randolph Hearst's newspapers played up the story, and the murder trial became known as "The Trial of the Century".

White's reputation was severely damaged by the testimony in the trial, as his sexual activities became public knowledge. The Evening Standard spoke of his "social dissolution". The Nation reconsidered his architectural work: "He adorned many an American mansion with irrelevant plunder." Newspaper accounts drew from the trial transcripts to describe White as "a sybarite of debauchery, a man who abandoned lofty enterprises for vicious revels."

Defenses
Few friends or associates publicly defended White, as some feared possible exposure for having participated in White's secret life. McKim responded to inquiries saying, "There is no statement to make...There will be no information coming from us."

Richard Harding Davis, a war correspondent and reputedly the model for the "Gibson Man", was angered by the press accounts, which he said presented a distorted view of his friend White. An editorial published in Vanity Fair, lambasting White, prompted Davis to a rebuttal. His article appeared on August 8, 1906, in Collier's magazine:
Since his death White has been described as a satyr. To answer this by saying that he was a great architect is not to answer at all...He admired a beautiful woman as he admired every other beautiful thing God has given us; and his delight over one was as keen, as boyish, as grateful over any others.

Autopsy
The autopsy report, made public by the coroner's testimony at the Thaw trial, revealed that White was in poor health when killed. He suffered from Bright's disease, incipient tuberculosis, and severe liver deterioration.

In popular culture
 In The Girl in the Red Velvet Swing, a 1955 movie, Ray Milland played White.
 The 1975 historical fiction novel Ragtime by E. L. Doctorow
 The 1981 film Ragtime, adapted from the novel of the same name. White was played by writer Norman Mailer, Thaw by Robert Joy, and Nesbit by Elizabeth McGovern.
 The 1996 musical Ragtime, based on the novel
 Dementia Americana – a long narrative poem by Keith Maillard (1994)
 My Sweetheart's the Man in the Moon – a play by Don Nigro
 La fille coupée en deux ("The Girl Cut in Two") – a 2007 film by Claude Chabrol was inspired, in part, by the Stanford White scandal.
 In the 2022 HBO series The Gilded Age, White is a recurring character who fictionally designed the nouveau riche Russell family's Upper East Side mansion. He is played by John Sanders.

Gallery of architectural works

See also
 McKim, Mead and White
 Evelyn Nesbit
Harry Kendall Thaw

References

Primary sources
White's extensive professional correspondence and a small body of personal correspondence, photographs, and architectural drawings by White are held by the Department of Drawings & Archives of Avery Architectural and Fine Arts Library at Columbia University. His letters to his family have been edited by Claire Nicolas White, Stanford White: Letters to His Family 1997. The major archive for his firm, McKim, Mead & White, is held by the New-York Historical Society.

Notes

Bibliography
 Baker, Paul R., Stanny: The Gilded Life of Stanford White, The Free Press, NY 1989
 Baatz, Simon, The Girl on the Velvet Swing: Sex, Murder, and Madness at the Dawn of the Twentieth Century (New York: Little, Brown, 2018) 
 Collins, Frederick L., Glamorous Sinners
 Craven, Wayne. Stanford White: Decorator in Opulence and Dealer in Antiquities, 2005
 Lessard, Suzannah, The Architect of Desire: Beauty and Danger in the Stanford White Family, Weidenfeld & Nicolson, London 1997 (written by White's great-granddaughter, a Whiting Award-winning writer for The New Yorker)
 Langford, Gerald, The Murder of Stanford White
 Mooney, Michael, Evelyn Nesbit and Stanford White: Love and Death in the Gilded Age, New York, Morrow, 1976
 Roth, Leland M., McKim, Mead & White, Architects, Harper & Row, Publishers, NY 1983
 Samuels, Charles, The Girl in the Red Velvet Swing
 Nesbit, Evelyn, The Story of My Life 1914
 Nesbit, Evelyn, Prodigal Days  1934
 Thaw, Harry, The Traitor
 Uruburu, Paula, American Eve: Evelyn Nesbit, Stanford White, The Birth of the "It" Girl and the Crime of the Century  Riverhead 2008
 White, Samuel G. with Wallen, Jonathan(photographer). The Houses of McKim, Mead and White 1998

External links

 Stanford White Papers,1873–1928 New-York Historical Society
 "Stanford White on Long Island" a museum essay on White's residential projects
 New York Architecture Images-New York Architects-McKim, Mead, and White Firm history with images
 
 Gilding the Gilded Age: Interior Decoration Tastes & Trends in New York City A collaboration between The Frick Collection and The William Randolph Hearst Archive at LIU Post.
 "Works of Art from the Collection of Stanford White", The Frick Collection/Frick Art Reference Library Archives. Digital images of a scrapbook compiled by Lawrence Grant White, son of Stanford White, on works of art collected by Stanford White, including paintings, sculpture, rugs, tapestries, and other decorative arts. 
 "Catalogue of Works of Art at 'Box Hill', St. James, Long Island", The Frick Collection/Frick Art Reference Library Archives. Pdf scan of inventory of works of art at Box Hill, the former Stanford White estate in Long Island, completed in 1942.
 The McKim Mead & White Architectural Records Collection at the New York Historical Society
 Stanford White correspondence and architectural drawings, 1887-1922, (bulk 1887-1907), held by the Avery Architectural and Fine Arts Library, Columbia University

1853 births
1906 deaths
1906 murders in the United States

American neoclassical architects
Beaux Arts architects
Architects from New York City
American murder victims
People murdered in New York City
Male murder victims
Deaths by firearm in Manhattan
American people of Scottish descent
19th-century American architects
20th-century American architects
Members of the Salmagundi Club
Fellows of the American Institute of Architects
Stanford White family